Louis I of Hungary (1326–1382) was King of Hungary and Croatia from 1342 and King of Poland from 1370.

Lajos Nagy may refer to:

 Lajos Nagy (writer) (1883-1954), Hungarian writer
 Lajos Nagy (footballer) (born 1975), Hungarian footballer
 Lajos Nagy (rower) (born 1924), Hungarian rower
 Lajos Nagy (sport shooter) (born 1945), Hungarian sports shooter
 Lajos Nagy (water polo) (born 1936), German Olympic water polo player
 Lajos Parti Nagy (born 1953), Hungarian poet, playwright and writer
 Lou Nagy (born 1960 as Lajos Nagy), Canadian football player